Fredonia Church is a historic church in Como, Mississippi.

The Greek Revival style building was constructed in 1848 and added to the National Register of Historic Places in 1978.

References

Churches on the National Register of Historic Places in Mississippi
Churches completed in 1848
Churches in Panola County, Mississippi
National Register of Historic Places in Panola County, Mississippi
Greek Revival church buildings in Mississippi